Claude Génia (1913–1979) was a Russian Empire-born French stage and film actress. She also appeared in television productions later in her career.

Selected filmography
 The Honourable Catherine (1943)
 Girl with Grey Eyes (1945)
 Father Goriot (1945)
 The Captain (1946)
 The Wolf (1949)
 The Farm of Seven Sins (1949)
 The Count of Monte Cristo (1954)
 Repeated Absences (1972)

References

Bibliography
 Goble, Alan. The Complete Index to Literary Sources in Film. Walter de Gruyter, 1999.

External links

1913 births
1979 deaths
French film actresses
French stage actresses
Emigrants from the Russian Empire to France
20th-century French women
Signatories of the 1971 Manifesto of the 343